Lelis syndrome is a genetic disorder, a rare condition with dermatological and dental findings characterized by the association of ectodermal dysplasia (hypotrichosis and hypohidrosis) with acanthosis nigricans. Other clinical features may include palmoplantar hyperkeratosis, nail dystrophy, intellectual deficit, disturbances of skin pigmentation (perioral and periorbital hyperpigmentation, vitiligo, and perinevic leukoderma) and hypodontia. Transmission is autosomal recessive.

See also
 List of cutaneous conditions

References

External links 

Rare syndromes
Syndromes affecting the skin
Genodermatoses
Genetic disorders with OMIM but no gene
Syndromes affecting teeth